The nitrite ion has the chemical formula . Nitrite (mostly sodium nitrite) is widely used throughout chemical and pharmaceutical industries. The nitrite anion is a pervasive intermediate in the nitrogen cycle in nature. The name nitrite also refers to organic compounds having the –ONO group, which are esters of nitrous acid.

Production
Sodium nitrite is made industrially by passing a mixture of nitrogen oxides into aqueous sodium hydroxide or sodium carbonate solution:

The product is purified by recrystallization. Alkali metal nitrites are thermally stable up to and beyond their melting point (441 °C for KNO2). Ammonium nitrite can be made from dinitrogen trioxide, N2O3, which is formally the anhydride of nitrous acid:
2 NH3 + H2O + N2O3 → 2 NH4NO2

Structure 

The nitrite ion has a symmetrical structure (C2v symmetry), with both N–O bonds having equal length and a bond angle of about 115°. In valence bond theory, it is described as a resonance hybrid with equal contributions from two canonical forms that are mirror images of each other. In molecular orbital theory, there is a sigma bond between each oxygen atom and the nitrogen atom, and a delocalized pi bond made from the p orbitals on nitrogen and oxygen atoms which is perpendicular to the plane of the molecule. The negative charge of the ion is equally distributed on the two oxygen atoms. Both nitrogen and oxygen atoms carry a lone pair of electrons. Therefore, the nitrite ion is a Lewis base.

Reactions

Acid-base properties 

Nitrite is the conjugate base of the weak acid nitrous acid:
HNO2  H+ + ; pKa ≈ 3.3 at 18 °C
Nitrous acid is also highly volatile – in the gas phase it exists predominantly as a trans-planar molecule. In solution, it is unstable with respect to the disproportionation reaction:
3 HNO2 (aq)  H3O+ +  + 2 NO
This reaction is slow at 0 °C. Addition of acid to a solution of a nitrite in the presence of a reducing agent, such as iron(II), is a way to make nitric oxide (NO) in the laboratory.

Oxidation and reduction 
The formal oxidation state of the nitrogen atom in nitrite is +3. This means that it can be either oxidized to oxidation states +4 and +5, or reduced to oxidation states as low as −3. Standard reduction potentials for reactions directly involving nitrous acid are shown in the table below: 
{|class="wikitable"
|-
!Half-reaction||E0 (V)
|-
|  + 3 H+ + 2 e−  HNO2 + H2O|| +0.94
|-
| 2 HNO2 + 4 H+ + 4 e−  H2N2O2 + 2 H2O||+0.86
|-
| N2O4 + 2 H+ + 2 e−  2 HNO2||+1.065
|-
| 2 HNO2+ 4 H+ + 4 e−  N2O + 3 H2O||+1.29
|}
The data can be extended to include products in lower oxidation states. For example:
H2N2O2 + 2 H+ + 2 e−  N2 + 2 H2O; E0 = +2.65 V

Oxidation reactions usually result in the formation of the nitrate ion, with nitrogen in oxidation state +5. For example, oxidation with permanganate ion can be used for quantitative analysis of nitrite (by titration):
5  + 2  + 6 H+ → 5  + 2 Mn2+ + 3 H2O

The product of reduction reactions with nitrite ion are varied, depending on the reducing agent used and its strength. With sulfur dioxide, the products are NO and N2O; with tin(II) (Sn2+) the product is hyponitrous acid (H2N2O2); reduction all the way to ammonia (NH3) occurs with hydrogen sulfide. With the hydrazinium cation the product of nitrite reduction is hydrazoic acid (HN3), an instable and explosive compound:

HNO2 +  → HN3 + H2O + H3O+
which can also further react with nitrite:
HNO2 + HN3 → N2O + N2 + H2O

This reaction is unusual in that it involves compounds with nitrogen in four different oxidation states.

Analysis of nitrite

Nitrite is detected and analyzed by the Griess Reaction, involving the formation of a deep red-colored azo dye upon treatment of a -containing sample with sulfanilic acid and naphthyl-1-amine in the presence of acid.

Coordination complexes 

Nitrite is an ambidentate ligand and can form a wide variety of coordination complexes by binding to metal ions in several ways. Two examples are the red nitrito complex [Co(NH3)5(ONO)]2+ is metastable, isomerizing to the yellow nitro complex [Co(NH3)5(NO2)]2+. Nitrite is processed by several enzymes, all of which utilize coordination complexes.

Biochemistry

In nitrification, ammonium is converted to nitrite.  Important species include Nitrosomonas. Other bacterial species such as Nitrobacter, are responsible for the oxidation of the nitrite into nitrate.

Nitrite can be reduced to nitric oxide or ammonia by many species of bacteria. Under hypoxic conditions, nitrite may release nitric oxide, which causes potent vasodilation. Several mechanisms for nitrite conversion to NO have been described, including enzymatic reduction by xanthine oxidoreductase, nitrite reductase, and NO synthase (NOS), as well as nonenzymatic acidic disproportionation reactions.

Uses

Chemical precursor
Azo dyes and other colorants are prepared by the process called diazotization, which requires nitrite.

Nitrite in food preservation and biochemistry 

Sodium nitrite is used to speed up the curing of meat and also impart an attractive colour. A 2018 study by the British Meat Producers Association determined that legally permitted levels of nitrite have no effect on the growth of the Clostridium botulinum bacteria which causes botulism, in line with the UK's Advisory Committee on the Microbiological Safety of Food opinion that nitrites are not required to prevent Clostridium botulinum growth and extend shelf life. In the U.S., meat cannot be labeled as "cured" without the addition of nitrite. In some countries, cured-meat products are manufactured without nitrate or nitrite, and without nitrite from vegetable source. Parma ham, produced without nitrite since 1993, was reported in 2018 to have caused no cases of botulism.

In mice, food rich in nitrites together with unsaturated fats can prevent hypertension, which is one explanation for the apparent health effect of the Mediterranean diet. However, adding nitrites to meat has been shown to generate known carcinogens; the World Health Organization (WHO) advises that eating  of nitrite processed meat a day would raise the risk of getting bowel cancer by 18% over a lifetime.
The recommended maximum limits by the World Health Organization in drinking water are 3 mg L−1 and 50 mg L−1 for nitrite and nitrate ions, respectively.

Curing of meat
In a reaction with the meat's myoglobin, nitrite gives the product a desirable pink-red "fresh" color, such as with corned beef. In the US, nitrite has been formally used since 1925. According to scientists working for the industry group American Meat Institute, this use of nitrite started in the Middle Ages. Historians and epidemiologists argue that the widespread use of nitrite in meat-curing is closely linked to the development of industrial meat-processing. French investigative journalist Guillaume Coudray asserts that the meat industry chooses to cure its meats with nitrite even though it is established that this chemical gives rise to cancer-causing nitroso-compounds.

Antidote for cyanide poisoning
Nitrites in the form of Sodium Nitrite and Amyl Nitrite are components of many cyanide antidote kits. Both of these compounds bind to haemoglobin and oxidizes the Fe2+ ions to Fe3+ ions forming methaemoglobin. Methaemoglobin in turn binds to cyanide (CN) creating cyanmethaemoglobin, effectively removing cyanide from the Complex IV of the Electron transport chain (ETC) in mitochondria, which is the primary site of disruption caused by cyanide. Another mechanism by which nitrites are useful in treating cyanide toxicity is the generation of Nitric oxide (NO). NO displaces the CN from the Cytochrome c Oxidase (ETC complex IV), making it available for methaemoglobin to bind.

Organic nitrites

In organic chemistry, alkyl nitrites are esters of nitrous acid and contain the nitrosoxy functional group. Nitro compounds contain the C–NO2 group. Nitrites have the general formula RONO, where R is an aryl or alkyl group. Amyl nitrite and other alkyl nitrites have a vasodilating action and must be handled in the laboratory with caution. They are sometimes used in medicine for the treatment of heart diseases. A classic named reaction for the synthesis of alkyl nitrites is the Meyer synthesis in which alkyl halides react with metallic nitrites to a mixture to nitroalkanes and nitrites.

Safety

Nitrites salts can react with secondary amines to produce N-nitrosamines, which are suspected to cause stomach cancer. The World Health Organization (WHO) advises that each  of processed meat eaten a day would raise the risk of getting bowel cancer by 18% over a lifetime; processed meat refers to meat that has been transformed through fermentation, nitrite curing, salting, smoking, or other processes to enhance flavour or improve preservation. The World Health Organization's review of more than 400 studies concluded, in 2015, that there was sufficient evidence that processed meats caused cancer, particularly colon cancer; the WHO's International Agency for Research on Cancer (IARC) classified processed meats as carcinogenic to humans (Group 1).

Nitrite (ingested) under conditions that result in endogenous nitrosation, specifically the production of nitrosamine, has been classified as "Probably carcinogenic to humans" (Group 2A) by the IARC.

See also
Curing (food preservation)
Alkyl nitrites

References

Bibliography

 Coudray, Guillaume, Who poisoned your bacon. London: Icon Books, 2021.

External links

Material Safety Data Sheet, sodium nitrite (archive)
ATSDR – Case Studies in Environmental Medicine – Nitrate/Nitrite Toxicity (archive) – US Department of Health and Human Services (public domain)
Article about Toxicity of Nitrite

Oxyanions
Curing agents
Garde manger
Nitrogen cycle
Preservatives